The oriole whistler (Pachycephala orioloides), also known as the yellow-throated whistler (leading to easy confusion with Pachycephala macrorhyncha), is a species of bird in the family Pachycephalidae, which is endemic to the Solomon Islands (archipelago).

Taxonomy and systematics
It is variably considered a subspecies of a widespread golden whistler (P. pectoralis) or treated as a separate species, but strong published evidence in favour of either treatment is limited, and further study is warranted to resolve the complex taxonomic situation. Even if not recognized as a separate species, the oriole whistler includes several very different subspecies, though the males are united by their yellow throat.

Subspecies
Nine subspecies are recognized:
 P. o. bougainvillei - Mayr, 1932: Found on Buka, Bougainville and Shortland Islands
 P. o. orioloides - Pucheran, 1853: Found on Choiseul, Malakobi, Santa Isabel and Florida Islands
 P. o. centralis - Mayr, 1932: Found on eastern New Georgia Islands
 P. o. melanoptera - Mayr, 1932: Found on southern New Georgia Islands
 P. o. melanonota - Hartert, 1908: Originally described as a separate species. Found on Ranongga and Vella Lavella 
 P. o. pavuvu - Mayr, 1932: Found on Pavuvu 
 P. o. sanfordi - Mayr, 1931: Originally described as a separate species. Found on Malaita
 P. o. cinnamomea - (Ramsay, EP, 1879): Originally described as a separate species in the genus Pseudorectes. Found on Beagle Island and Guadalcanal 
 P. o. christophori - Tristram, 1879: Originally described as a separate species. Found on Santa Ana and San Cristóbal Island

Distribution
The oriole whistler is found throughout the Solomons, except in the Santa Cruz Islands.

References

oriole whistler
Birds of the Solomon Islands
oriole whistler